Quicksilver Highway is a 1997 television comedy horror film directed by Mick Garris. It is based on Clive Barker's short story "The Body Politic" and Stephen King's 1992 short story "Chattery Teeth". The film was originally shown on television before being released on home media.

Plot

The main story is centered on Aaron Quicksilver (played by Christopher Lloyd), a travelling showman who tells horror stories to the people he meets. He first runs into a newly married couple who are hitchhiking, to whom he tells the story "Chattery Teeth", about a man who is saved from a dangerous hitchhiker by a set of wind-up toy teeth. He later runs into a pickpocket to whom he tells "The Body Politic", a story about a man whose hands rebel against him.

Cast

Christopher Lloyd: Aaron Quicksilver
Matt Frewer: Charlie/Dr. Charles George
Raphael Sbarge: Kerry Parker/Bill Hogan
Melissa Lahlitah Crider: Olivia Harmon Parker/Lita Hogan 
Silas Weir Mitchell: Bryan Adams
Bill Nunn: Len
Veronica Cartwright: Myra
Bill Bolender: Scooter
Amelia Heinle: Darlene
Cynthia Garris: Ellen George
Kevin Grevioux: Sergeant
Christopher Hart: Lefty
William Knight: Rhinoplasty Man 
Shawn Nelson: Driver
Sherry O'Keefe: Harriet DaVinci 
Clive Barker: Anesthesiologist 
Constance Zimmer: Patient 
Mick Garris: Surgeon 
John Landis: Surgical Assistant

Production 
Creative Artists Agency met with Garris about him writing the pilot script for a possible horror television series directed by John McTiernan and produced by his wife, Donna Dubrow. The agency suggested multiple ghost stories and urban legends to write about, but Garris had another idea. The series would follow a mysterious character who describes himself as "only a storyteller" but is actually much more than that. Each episode would be set in a different location, with the same actors playing different characters. Just after Brandon Tartikoff signed on as producer, Garris pitched the idea to staff at the American Broadcasting Company; the heads of the network weren't interested as they didn't want any horror material in their broadcast schedule, but a couple of the network's executives like Greer Shephard got on board. After writing a pilot script based on Stephen King's short story "Chattery Teeth," Garris pitched the series to Fox. However, Fox wanted a two-hour television film. He wrote a screenplay of Clive Barker's "The Body Politic" to serve as the film's second part after "Chattery Teeth." Casting director Lynn Kressel, who previously worked with Garris on The Stand (1994) and The Shining (1997), came up with the idea of Christopher Lloyd as Quicksilver; while the network loved the decision, Garris was a bit skeptical, reasoning that he want a "little more seductive" actor to play the part. In the end, however, Garris loved the decision.

The moment Fox began developing the project, McTiernan left the director's seat on the project, leaving Garris to have to direct the screenplay himself. "The Body Politic" was filmed at the Santa Monica Pier, while "Chattery Teeth" was filmed in Lancaster, California. When playing Dr. Charles George, Matt Frewer had a tough time making the hand move as if it had a separate mind; it took around three days for him to master the trick, and by the third day was having "hand nightmares" while resting between shoots. Steve Johnson handled the chattery teeth effects, while Flash Film Works and Bill Mesa was responsible for the moving hands. Around 90% of the hands were digitally animated with LightWave 3D and composed in the shots with the Chyron program Liberty. The more practical hand effects, such as George's left hand, were performed by Christopher Hart, whose work as a magician got him hand-only characters in projects such as three Addams Family films. The same trick for composing Hart's hand into the shots of The Addams Family films was used in Quicksilver Highway; Hart wore a rubber prosthetic on the top of his hand and a green sleeve, and by using green screening and footage that matched the background of the shots of Hart's hand, his arm was removed. Four days were spent shooting Hart's hand.

Home media 
The home media version of Quicksilver Highway switched the orders of the two stories from the television version, where "The Body Politic" comes first and "Chattery Teeth" last. Fox required this change, which Garris disliked as he felt "The Body Politic" was more climactic than "Chattery Teeth."

See also 
List of Stephen King films

References

Works cited

External links 
 
 

American horror television films
1990s supernatural horror films
Television shows based on works by Stephen King
1997 television films
1997 films
American supernatural horror films
1997 horror films
Films directed by Mick Garris
Films based on multiple works
Films based on short fiction
American horror anthology films
Films based on works by Clive Barker
Films based on works by Stephen King
Films scored by Mark Mothersbaugh
Films shot in Los Angeles County, California
1990s American films